Eva Sofia Jakobsson (born 23 April 1990) is a Swedish professional footballer who plays for San Diego Wave in the National Women's Soccer League. She made her debut for the Sweden women's national football team in 2011 and won her 100th cap in 2019. Jakobsson represented her country in the 2013 edition of the UEFA Women's Championship, as well as at the 2011, 2015 and 2019 FIFA Women's World Cups. She also played at the 2012, 2016 and 2020 Olympic Football Tournaments.

Club career
After playing one season in the second tier for Östers IF, Jakobsson signed in 2007, at 17, for national champion Umeå IK. In her five seasons in Umeå she won two championships and one national cup, and she made her UEFA Women's Cup debut. After Umeå lost its dominant position in the Damallsvenskan since 2009, Jakobsson transferred to Russian champion WFC Rossiyanka to again play the UEFA Women's Champions League.

Jakobsson signed for Chelsea Ladies in January 2013. She scored on her debut in a 1–1 draw with Birmingham, and then scored a brace in her next game against Doncaster Rovers Belles. She scored in her third consecutive Women's Super League game in a 2–1 win over the Liverpool Ladies. She scored two more goals in the remaining eight games, ending as Chelsea's top scorer along with Eniola Aluko.

With three WSL games remaining until the end of the season she moved to the German Bundesliga alongside teammate Ester, signing for newly promoted team BV Cloppenburg. In July 2014, Jakobsson signed for Montpellier HSC of the French Division 1 Féminine. 

In July 2019, Jakobsson joined Real Madrid Feminino of the Spanish Primera División, who at that time went under the name CD Tacon, along with her national teammate, Kosovare Asllani. During her first season in Spain, Jakobsson scored most goals and most assists in the capital club scoring eight goals and seven assists. 

In June 2021, Jakobsson announced that she was departing Real Madrid. On 2 July 2021, she signed with Bayern Munich in the top German league, the Frauen-Bundesliga. Jakobsson made only five appearances with Bayern Munich, and in January 2022, was signed by the American team San Diego Wave FC of the National Women's Soccer League.

International career
Jakobsson made her debut for the Sweden national team in 2011. She has represented Sweden in three World Cups (Germany 2011, Canada 2015, France 2019) and three Olympic Games (London 2012, Rio 2016, Tokyo 2020.) Her squad finished in third place in two of those World Cups (2011 and 2019), and won silver medals both in Rio and in Tokyo. She also appeared at the 2013 European Championship. Jakobsson was the top scorer of the 2015 Algarve Cup, netting four times for Sweden.

Jakobsson suffered an anterior cruciate ligament injury in January 2017 while training with her French club. She was ruled out of Sweden's squad for UEFA Women's Euro 2017.

In April 2019, Jakobsson won her 100th cap, marking the occasion with a goal in Sweden's 2–0 friendly win over Austria in Maria Enzersdorf.

In the Quarter-Final of the 2019 Women's World Cup, Jakobsson scored a game-tying goal within ten minutes of Germany taking an early lead. Sweden would go on to win the match, posting their first victory over the Germans in a major tournament since the 1995 World Cup. She also tallied what proved to be the winning goal in the 3rd Place Match of that tournament, scoring in the 22nd minute against England.

Sofia was voted as the player of the match in the Quarter-Final vs Germany, and the 3rd Place Match against England.

Career statistics

International
Scores and results list Sweden's goal tally first, score column indicates score after each Jakobsson goal.

Matches and goals scored at World Cup & Olympic tournaments

Matches and goals scored at European Championship tournaments

Honours
Umeå IK
 Damallsvenskan: 2007, 2008
 Svenska Cupen: 2007
 Svenska Supercupen: 2007, 2008

WFC Rossiyanka
 Russian Championship: 2011–12

Sweden
Summer Olympic Games: Silver Medal 2016
FIFA Women's World Cup: Bronze Medal 2019

See also

 List of foreign FA Women's Super League players

Notes

References

Match reports

External links

Profile  at SvFF

Player French football stats  at statsfootofeminin.fr
Profile  at Montpellier HSC

1990 births
Living people
Swedish women's footballers
People from Örnsköldsvik Municipality
Sweden women's international footballers
2011 FIFA Women's World Cup players
2015 FIFA Women's World Cup players
Footballers at the 2012 Summer Olympics
Footballers at the 2016 Summer Olympics
Olympic footballers of Sweden
Chelsea F.C. Women players
Umeå IK players
Damallsvenskan players
Montpellier HSC (women) players
Women's Super League players
FC Bayern Munich (women) players
San Diego Wave FC players
Expatriate women's footballers in England
Expatriate women's footballers in France
Expatriate women's footballers in Germany
Expatriate women's footballers in Russia
Expatriate women's footballers in Spain
Expatriate women's soccer players in the United States
WFC Rossiyanka players
Swedish expatriate sportspeople in Russia
Swedish expatriate sportspeople in Germany
Swedish expatriate sportspeople in France
Swedish expatriate sportspeople in England
Swedish expatriate sportspeople in Spain
Swedish expatriate sportspeople in the United States
Swedish expatriate women's footballers
Women's association football forwards
Medalists at the 2016 Summer Olympics
Olympic silver medalists for Sweden
Olympic medalists in football
Division 1 Féminine players
FIFA Century Club
2019 FIFA Women's World Cup players
Frauen-Bundesliga players
Real Madrid Femenino players
Footballers at the 2020 Summer Olympics
Medalists at the 2020 Summer Olympics
National Women's Soccer League players
Sportspeople from Västernorrland County
UEFA Women's Euro 2022 players